Lingelbach is a surname. Notable people with the surname include: 

Frank J. Lingelbach (1888–1947), American businessman and politician
Johannes Lingelbach (1622–1674), Dutch Golden Age painter